Samir Trimbakrao Kunwar is the current Member of Legislative Assembly from the Hinganghat of Maharashtra state of India. In Maharashtra Assembly elections of 2019, Samir Trimbakrao Kunawar from the side of Bhartiya Janata Party won the election with massive 53.83% of the total votes of the constituency. He also won in Maharashtra assembly election, 2014 on Hinganghat seat from the Bhartiya Janata Party by defeating the Bahujan Samajvadi Party's candidate by a margin of 65175 votes which was 34.67% of the total votes polled in the constituency. Bhartiya Janata Party had a vote share of 48.02% in 2014 in the seat.

Personal information 
Samir Trimbakrao Kunwar's father's name is Traymbakrao Devidaspant Kunwar. His education is done till higher secondary classes, he is 12th pass. S. T. Kunwar's net worth is nearly 10.7 crore Indian Rupees. Samir Trimbakrao is other than a politician, a farmer and a businessman.

References 

Living people
Year of birth missing (living people)
Maharashtra MLAs 2019–2024
Bharatiya Janata Party politicians from Maharashtra
Marathi people